Elections to Cornwall County Council were held on 7 May 1981.

Results

|}

References

Cornwall
1981
1980s in Cornwall